The President's Medal of the IOP is awarded by the Institute of Physics (IOP), with a maximum of two per presidency. It was first established in 1997, and is for "meritorious services in various fields of endeavour which were of benefit to physics in general and the Institute in particular". It is presented personally by the president of the Institute.

Medallists
The following persons have received this medal:

See also
 Institute of Physics Awards
 List of physics awards

References

Awards established in 1997
Awards of the Institute of Physics
Physics awards